Ribnik is a village and a municipality in Karlovac County, Croatia. There are a total of 475 inhabitants in the municipality, 98.74% of whom are Croats.

References

Municipalities of Croatia
Populated places in Karlovac County